Finnish composer Einojuhani Rautavaara wrote his Symphony No. 7, subtitled Angel of Light, in 1994. It was originally known as The Bloomington Symphony, as it was commissioned to celebrate the 25th anniversary of the founding of the Bloomington Symphony Orchestra. Belonging to his Angel Series, inspired by childhood dreams and revelations, the symphony has won wide popularity for its deep spirituality. The premier performance was by the Bloomington Symphony Orchestra in 1994. In 1997 the premiere recording, by Segerstam, was nominated for the Grammy Award for "Best Classical Contemporary Composition".

Movements
 Tranquillo ("tranquil", about 12 minutes)
 Molto allegro ("lively tempo", about 6 minutes)
 Come un sogno ("like a dream, about 10 minutes)
 Pesante - Cantabile ("profound - song-like", about 10 minutes)

Instrumentation

Woodwinds 
2 Flutes
2 Oboes
2 Clarinets in B♭ 
2 Bassoons

Brass 
4 Horns in F
3 Trumpets in B♭
3 Trombones
1 Tuba

Percussion (4 players) 
Timpani
Suspended cymbal
Snare drum
Glockenspiel
Xylophone
Marimba
Vibraphone
Tom-toms
Tam-tams

Strings 
Violin I
Violin II
Violas
Cellos
Double basses
Harp

Recordings

References

Compositions by Einojuhani Rautavaara
Rautavaara 7
1994 compositions